Lempdes (Auvergnat: Lende) is a commune in the Puy-de-Dôme department in Auvergne in central France.

Population

Sights

The neo-romanesque parish church of St Étienne was built in 1867, replacing a previous church building that dated from the 12th century. It is first recorded in a document of the beginning of the 13th century.

Notable people
 Pierre-Jules Boulanger, inventor of 2CV car.
Jean-Baptiste Lamy, Archbishop of Santa Fe, New Mexico

See also
Communes of the Puy-de-Dôme department

References

Further reading

Lempdes: mémoire d'un village. Lempdes: Association "Lempdes: mémoire d'un village", 2000 ("Un recueil de souvenirs ... le fruit d'un long travail dont les Amis du Vieux Lempdes ont été les artisans"—preface)

Communes of Puy-de-Dôme